Azizbek Ashurov is a Kyrgyz lawyer who was born in Uzbekistan. He is the founder of Ferghana Valley Lawyers Without Borders organization and helped the Kyrgyzstan government become the first to end statelessness.

He was awarded the Nansen Refugee Award in 2019.

Personal life 
Ashurov and his family moved from Uzbekistan to Kyrgyzstan after the dissolution of the Soviet Union in 1991. Despite his legal training, he struggled to navigate the process of getting Kyrgyz citizenship.

Career 
Ashurov helped set Ferghana Valley Lawyers Without Borders organisation to support statement people in Kyrgyzstan obtain citizenship and then collaborated with the Kyrgyzstan government on efforts to end statelessness in Kyrgyzstan, and an amnesty on all fines levied towards stateless people. Ashurov travelled by car and by horse to support undocumented people in remote parts of Kyrgyzstan, and the final 13,000 stateless people obtained citizenship in 2019, making Kyrgyzstan the first country to end statelessness.

In 2019, Ashurov was awarded the Nansen Refugee Award.

References

External links 

 Interview - Azizbek Ashurov, winner of the 2019 Nansen Award, European Network on Statelessness, 17 Dec 2019

Kyrgyzstani lawyers
Uzbekistani emigrants
Organization founders
Human rights lawyers
Statelessness
Living people
Year of birth missing (living people)
Nansen Refugee Award laureates